Alan Hugh Noble (19 June 1900 – 1973), sometimes known as Smiler Noble, was an English professional footballer who played as an outside right and right half in the Football League for Leeds United, Brentford and Millwall.

Career statistics

References

1900 births
Footballers from Southampton
English footballers
English Football League players
Brentford F.C. players
Association football wing halves
Southampton F.C. players
AFC Bournemouth players
Leeds United F.C. players
Millwall F.C. players
Southern Football League players
1973 deaths
Association football outside forwards